This is a list of fireworks accidents and incidents:

See also 
 List of accidents and disasters by death toll
 List of industrial disasters
 List of nightclub fires (several result from pyrotechnic failures)

References 

fireworks